A drop kick is dropping the ball and kicking it after it has bounced, in various types of football.

Drop kick or dropkick may also refer to:

Arts and entertainment
 Dropkick, an attacking maneuver in professional wrestling
 The Drop Kick, 1927 movie about a college football player
 Dropkick (Transformers), a Decepticon pickup truck
 Drop Kick (album), 1992 jazz album by Steve Coleman

People
 Dropkick Daniels (Joseph Bruce, born 1972), ring name of professional wrestler, stagename Violent J
 Dropkick Murphy (1912–1977), American professional wrestler and sanatorium owner

Other uses
 Operation Drop Kick, a 1956 US entomological warfare field testing program

See also
 Dropkick Murphys, Celtic punk band
 "Everybody Goes (Chitsujo no Nai Gendai ni Drop Kick)", a 1994 Japanese rock single by Mr. Children
 "Drop Kick Me Jesus (Through The Goalposts Of Life)", a 1976 country waltz by Bobby Bare